The Five Mile River is a  river located in Connecticut's Northeast Corner and flows through the towns of Thompson, Putnam, and Killingly.The original Nipmuc name was Assawaga, meaning "place between" or "halfway place". The Assawaga received its English name from the fact that the first land laid out upon it was "supposed to be about five miles from" Woodstock, Connecticut. The Five Mile is a tributary of the Quinebaug River and is part of the Thames River watershed. Its source is Little Pond (also known as Schoolhouse Pond), close to the Massachusetts border. It empties into the Quinebaug River at Danielson, near the intersection of Connecticut Route 12 and U.S. Route 6.

The Fivemile River has several dams, most of which are former mill operations. Its largest impoundment is Quaddick Reservoir, though there are several smaller dams including those that were built for the purpose of harnessing waterpower for industry. The best examples of surviving mill villages can be seen in Killingly in villages such as Pineville, Ballouville, Attawaugan, and Dayville.

See also
List of rivers of Connecticut

References
Killingly, Windham County, Connecticut History
Environmental Protection Agency
Connecticut Department of Environmental Protection

Rivers of Windham County, Connecticut
Killingly, Connecticut
Rivers of Connecticut
Tributaries of the Thames River (Connecticut)